Villa El Carmen, also known as Villa Carlos Fonseca is a town and a municipality in the Managua department of Nicaragua. Its sister city is Moscow, Idaho.

International relations

Twin towns – Sister cities
Villa el Carmen is twinned with:

References

External links
 Villa Carlos Fonseca A Google satellite map
http://www.maplandia.com/nicaragua/managua/villa-carlos-fonseca-a

Municipalities of the Managua Department